Bruce Bingham designed sailboats including the Flicka 20 and, on the larger end, the Fantasia 35, Anastasia 32, and the Andromeda 48.

Bingham is also noted as an author, having written Workbench, a longstanding column in Cruising World magazine. He also wrote a number of sailing books including Ferro Cement: Design, Techniques and Applications and Cruising Sketchbook.

Designs
Bingham's designs include:

Flicka 20 - 1974
Andromeda 48 - 1976
Fantasia 35 - 1976
Anastasia 32 - 1977
Allegra 24 - 1984

References

American naval architects

Possibly living people

Year of birth missing